M. Chandra Prabha is an Indian politician who served as a Member of Legislative Assembly of Tamil Nadu. He was elected from Srivilliputhur Assembly constituency as an All India Anna Dravida Munnetra Kazhagam candidate in 2016.

References 

Living people

Year of birth missing (living people)
All India Anna Dravida Munnetra Kazhagam politicians
Tamil Nadu MLAs 2016–2021